The 1973–74 French Division 2 was the 33rd season since its establishment. It was constituted by two groups (A and B) with 18 clubs each. The winners of each group won promotion to the 1974–75 French Division 1. Additionally, the winners met in a two-legged championship play–off. The victor was crowned champion and awarded the trophy. Meanwhile, the runners-up of both groups faced each other in a two-legged play-off, with the victor claiming the last promotion spot.

The season began on 1 July 1973 and ended on 5 June 1974. The winter break was in effect from 22 December 1973 to 12 January 1974. Two points were awarded for a win, with no points for a loss. If the match was drawn, each team received one point. Likewise, this season was the first time that bonus points were awarded: any team scoring three or more goals in a match received an additional point. During the play–offs, if the aggregate score was tied after two legs, the match was decided by extra time and/or penalty shootout.

League tables

Group A

Group B

Championship play-offs

Promotion play-offs

References

External links
France - List of final tables (RSSSF)

Ligue 2 seasons
French
2